Saraswathi is a 1970 Indian Malayalam-language film, directed by Thikkurissy Sukumaran Nair and produced by A. L. Sreenivasan. It stars Prem Nazir, Thikkurissy Sukumaran Nair, Muthukulam Raghavan Pillai and Ragini, and was scored by M. S. Baburaj.

Cast
Prem Nazir as Unni Kurup
Thikkurissy Sukumaran Nair as Gokulam Govinda Kurup
Muthukulam Raghavan Pillai as Raman Nair
Vijayalalitha as Madanabala
K. P. Ummer as Vikraman
Meena as Meenakshi
Ragini as Saraswathi
Bahadoor as Chellappan
T. S. Muthaiah as Panikker
Adoor Bhasi as Nadanarangan
Khadeeja as Neelambari Akkan

Soundtrack
The music was composed by M. S. Baburaj and the lyrics were written by Thikkurissy Sukumaran Nair.

References

External links
 

1970 films
1970s Malayalam-language films
Films directed by Thikkurissy Sukumaran Nair